The World Group was the highest level of Davis Cup competition in 2002. The first-round losers went into the Davis Cup World Group Play-offs, and the winners progress to the quarterfinals. The quarterfinalists were guaranteed a World Group spot for 2003.

Participating Teams

Draw

First round

France vs. Netherlands

Czech Republic vs. Brazil

Spain vs. Morocco

United States vs. Slovakia

Russia vs. Switzerland

Great Britain vs. Sweden

Croatia vs. Germany

Argentina vs. Australia

Quarterfinals

France vs. Czech Republic

United States vs. Spain

Russia vs. Sweden

Argentina vs. Croatia

Semifinals

France vs. United States

Russia vs. Argentina

Final

France vs. Russia

References

World Group
Davis Cup World Group